2007 Algiers bombings may refer to:
11 April 2007 Algiers bombings, car bombs that exploded in the Algerian prime minister's headquarters and a police stations, Algiers, Algieria
11 December 2007 Algiers bombings, car bombs that exploded near the Supreme Constitutional Court and the United Nationsoffices, Algiers, Algieria